"Mala Santa" (stylized in all caps) is a song recorded by American singer Becky G. Written by Gomez, Luian Malavé Nieves, Edgar Semper, Xavier Semper, Kedin Maisonet and Pablo C. Fuentes, it was released by Kemosabe Records, RCA Records and Sony Music Latin on October 11, 2019, as the fifth and final single from Gomez's debut studio album of the same name.

Music video
Due to the LP being a visual album, the song does not have an official video despite being the fifth single. Instead, it was released under the title "MALA SANTA (Álbum Visual)".
The clip sees Gomez wearing two different body suits, one in white and the other in black, with a blue lighting background for the former and a red one for the latter. She performs the same choreography in one cut on both; these scenes are spliced in between each other.

Live performance
Gomez performed the song live for the first time at the Latin American Music Awards of 2019 in a medley with her hit songs "Sin Pijama" and "Mayores". She performed the medley again with a different arrangement at the LOS40 Music Awards 2019 about three weeks later.

Credits and personnel
 Rebbeca Marie Gomez – vocals, songwriter
 Luian Malavé Nieves – songwriter, producer
 Edgar Semper – songwriter, producer
 Xavier Semper – songwriter, producer
 Kedin Maisonet – songwriter
 Pablo C. Fuentes – songwriter

Charts

Weekly charts

Year-end charts

Certifications

Release history

References

2019 singles
2019 songs
Becky G songs
Spanish-language songs
Songs written by Becky G
Songs written by Edgar Semper
Songs written by Xavier Semper